Syed Muhammad Agha Raza is a Pakistani politician who was a Member of the Provincial Assembly of Balochistan, from May 2013 to May 2018.

Early life and education
He was born on 15 August 1968 in Quetta.

He has a degree in Master of Arts.

Political career

He was elected to the Provincial Assembly of Balochistan as a candidate of Majlis Wahdat-e-Muslimeen from Constituency PB-2 Quetta-II in 2013 Pakistani general election.

In January 2018, he was inducted into the provincial Balochistan cabinet of Chief Minister Abdul Quddus Bizenjo and was made Provincial Minister of Balochistan for Law and parliamentary affairs with the additional ministerial portfolios of prosecution, forest and wildlife, and Livestock and Dairy Development.

References

Living people
Balochistan MPAs 2013–2018
1968 births